Jürgen Gerhard Pichorner (born 31 August 1977) is an Austrian football midfielder who currently plays for SCR Altach.

References

1977 births
Living people
Austrian footballers
FC Red Bull Salzburg players
SV Ried players
FC Kärnten players
Austrian Football Bundesliga players

Association football midfielders